Orekhovo is a rural locality (a selo) and the administrative center of Orekhovsky Selsoviet, Burlinsky District, Altai Krai, Russia. The population was 540 as of 2013. It was founded in 1910. There are 4 streets.

Geography 
Orekhovo is located 27 km southwest of Burla (the district's administrative centre) by road. Tsvetopol and Chernavka are the nearest rural localities.

References 

Rural localities in Burlinsky District